Vriesea warmingii is a species of flowering plant in the family Bromeliaceae, endemic to Brazil. , the species was accepted by the Encyclopaedia of Bromeliads, but regarded as a synonym of Vriesea ensiformis by Plants of the World Online.

References

warmingii
Flora of Brazil